In Japanese, Keihan may refer to:

 , the Kyoto-Osaka area, part of the larger  area.
 , a Kyoto-Osaka train line, often abbreviated to Keihan.
 , a local dish of the Amami Islands, Kagoshima Prefecture in the south of Japan.